The Riverside Parkway is a , five-lane limited-access road in the lower central business district of Grand Junction, Colorado. Paralleling the Colorado River, it connects several of the major highways in the city, and has bike lanes in both directions. Billboards are not allowed within  of the parkway.

References

Colorado River
Grand Junction, Colorado
Transportation in Mesa County, Colorado